Milan Drageljević (born 28 February 1977) is a Serbian former footballer who played as a defender. He played in the 2. Bundesliga with Eintracht Trier.

References

1977 births
Living people
Footballers from Belgrade
Serbian footballers
Association football defenders
FK Zvezdara players
OFK Beograd players
SV Eintracht Trier 05 players
2. Bundesliga players
Regionalliga players
Serbian expatriate footballers
Expatriate footballers in Germany
Serbian expatriate sportspeople in Germany